A quinolone antibiotic is a member of a large group of broad-spectrum bacteriocidals that share a bicyclic core structure related to the substance 4-quinolone. They are used in human and veterinary medicine to treat bacterial infections, as well as in animal husbandry, specifically poultry production.

Nearly all quinolone antibiotics in use are fluoroquinolones, which contain a fluorine atom in their chemical structure and are effective against both Gram-negative and Gram-positive bacteria. One example is ciprofloxacin, one of the most widely used antibiotics worldwide.

Medical uses 

Fluoroquinolones are often used for genitourinary infections and are widely used in the treatment of hospital-acquired infections associated with urinary catheters. In community-acquired infections, they are recommended only when risk factors for multidrug resistance are present or after other antibiotic regimens have failed. However, for serious acute cases of pyelonephritis or bacterial prostatitis where the person may need to be hospitalised, fluoroquinolones are recommended as first-line therapy.

Due to people with sickle-cell disease being at increased risk for developing osteomyelitis from the Salmonella, fluoroquinolones are the "drugs of choice" due to their ability to enter bone tissue without chelating it, as tetracyclines are known to do.

Fluoroquinolones are featured prominently in guidelines for the treatment of hospital-acquired pneumonia.

Children 
In most countries, fluoroquinolones are approved for use in children only under narrowly defined circumstances, owing in part to the observation of high rates of musculoskeletal adverse events in fluoroquinolone-treated juvenile animals. In the UK, the prescribing indications for fluoroquinolones for children are severely restricted. Only inhalant anthrax and pseudomonal infections in cystic fibrosis infections are licensed indications in the UK due to ongoing safety concerns. In a study comparing the safety and efficacy of levofloxacin to that of azithromycin or ceftriaxone in 712 children with community-acquired pneumonia, serious adverse events were experienced by 6% of those treated with levofloxacin and 4% of those treated with comparator antibiotics. Most of these were considered by the treating physician to be unrelated or doubtfully related to the study drug. Two deaths were observed in the levofloxacin group, neither of which was thought to be treatment-related. Spontaneous reports to the U.S. FDA Adverse Effects Reporting System at the time of the 20 September 2011 U.S. FDA Pediatric Drugs Advisory Committee included musculoskeletal events (39, including five cases of tendon rupture) and central nervous system events (19, including five cases of seizures) as the most common spontaneous reports between April 2005 and March 2008. An estimated 130,000 pediatric prescriptions for levofloxacin were filled on behalf of 112,000 pediatric patients during that period.

Meta-analyses conclude that fluoroquinolones pose little or no additional risk to children compared to other antibiotic classes. Fluoroquinolone use in children may be appropriate when the infection is caused by multidrug-resistant bacteria, or when alternative treatment options require parenteral administration and oral therapy is preferred.

Adverse effects 
While typical drug side effects reactions are mild to moderate, sometimes serious adverse effects occur.

Boxed warnings
In 2008, the U.S. FDA added black box warnings on all fluoroquinolones, advising of the increased risk of tendon damage. In 2016, the FDA found that systemic use (by mouth or injection) of fluoroquinolones was associated with "disabling and potentially permanent serious side effects" involving the tendons, muscles, joints, nerves, and central nervous system, concluding that these side effects generally outweigh the benefits for people with acute sinusitis, acute bronchitis, and uncomplicated urinary tract infections when other treatment options are available. Concerns regarding low blood sugar and mental health problems were added in 2018.

Tendons
Quinolones are associated with a small risk of tendonitis and tendon rupture; a 2013 review found the incidence of tendon injury among those taking fluoroquinolones to be between 0.08 and 0.20%. The risk appears to be higher among people older than 60 and those also taking corticosteroids; the risk also may be higher among people who are male, have a pre-existing joint or tendon issue, have kidney disease, or are highly active. Some experts have advised avoidance of fluoroquinolones in athletes. If tendonitis occurs, it generally appears within one month, and the most common tendon injured appears to be the Achilles tendon. The cause is not well understood.

Nervous system
Nervous-system effects include insomnia, restlessness, and rarely, seizure, convulsions, and psychosis. Other rare and serious adverse events have been observed with varying degrees of evidence for causation.

Aortic dissection
Fluoroquinolones can increase the rate of rare but serious tears in the aorta by 31% compared to other antibiotics. People at increased risk include those with aortic aneurysm, hypertension, certain genetic conditions such as Marfan syndrome and Ehlers-Danlos syndrome, and the elderly. For these people, fluoroquinolones should be used only when no other treatment options are available.

Colitis
Clostridium difficile colitis may occur in connection with the use of any antibacterial drug, especially those with a broad spectrum of activity such as clindamycin, cephalosporins, and fluoroquinolones. Fluoroquinoline treatment is associated with risk that is similar to or less than that associated with broad spectrum cephalosporins. Fluoroquinoline administration may be associated with the acquisition and outgrowth of a particularly virulent Clostridium strain.

Other
More generally, fluoroquinolones are tolerated, with typical drug side effects being mild to moderate. Common side effects include gastrointestinal effects such as nausea, vomiting, and diarrhea, as well as headache and insomnia. Postmarketing surveillance has revealed a variety of relatively rare but serious adverse effects associated with all members of the fluoroquinolone antibacterial class. Among these, tendon problems and exacerbation of the symptoms of the neurological disorder myasthenia gravis are the subject of "black box" warnings in the United States.

A 2018 EU-wide review of fluoroquinolones concluded that they are associated with serious side effects including tendonitis, tendon rupture, arthralgia, pain in extremities, gait disturbance, neuropathies associated with paraesthesia, depression, fatigue, memory impairment, sleep disorders, and impaired hearing, vision, taste and smell. Tendon damage (especially to Achilles tendon but also other tendons) can occur within 48 hours of starting fluoroquinolone treatment but the damage may be delayed several months after stopping treatment.

The overall rate of adverse events in people treated with fluoroquinolones is roughly similar to that seen in people treated with other antibiotic classes. A U.S. Centers for Disease Control and Prevention study found people treated with fluoroquinolones experienced adverse events severe enough to lead to an emergency department visit more frequently than those treated with cephalosporins or macrolides, but less frequently than those treated with penicillins, clindamycin, sulfonamides, or vancomycin.

Fluoroquinolones prolong the heart's QT interval by blocking voltage-gated potassium channels. Prolongation of the QT interval can lead to torsades de pointes, a life-threatening arrhythmia, but in practice, this appears relatively uncommon in part because the most widely prescribed fluoroquinolones (ciprofloxacin and levofloxacin) only minimally prolong the QT interval.

In 2019 study by Journal of the American College of Cardiology it was discovered that fluoroquinolones could increase the risk for heart valve diseases.

Events that may occur in acute overdose are rare, and include kidney failure and seizure. Susceptible groups of patients, such as children and the elderly, are at greater risk of adverse reactions during therapeutic use.

Mechanism of toxicity
The mechanisms of the toxicity of fluoroquinolones have been attributed to their interactions with different receptor complexes, such as blockade of the GABAa receptor complex within the central nervous system, leading to excitotoxic type effects and oxidative stress.

Interactions 
Products containing multivalent cations, such as aluminium- or magnesium-containing antacids, and products containing calcium, iron, or zinc invariably result in marked reduction of oral absorption of fluoroquinolones. Other drugs that interact with fluoroquinolones include sucralfate, probenecid, cimetidine, theophylline, warfarin, antiviral agents, phenytoin, cyclosporine, rifampin, pyrazinamide, and cycloserine.

Administration of quinolone antibiotics to a benzodiazepine-dependent individual can precipitate acute benzodiazepine withdrawal symptoms due to quinolones displacing benzodiazepines from their binding sites. Fluoroquinolones have varying specificity for cytochrome P450, so may have interactions with drugs cleared by those enzymes; the order from most P450-inhibitory to least, is enoxacin > ciprofloxacin > norfloxacin > ofloxacin, levofloxacin, trovafloxacin, gatifloxacin, moxifloxacin.

Contraindications 
Quinolones are not recommended in people with epilepsy, Marfan's syndrome, Ehlers-Danlos Syndrome, QT prolongation, pre-existing CNS lesions, or CNS inflammation, or who have had a stroke. They are best avoided in the athlete population. Safety concerns exist for fluoroquinolone use during pregnancy, so they are contraindicated unless no other safe alternative antibiotic exists. However, one meta-analysis looking at the outcome of pregnancies involving quinolone use in the first trimester found no increased risk of malformations. They are also contraindicated in children due to the risks of damage to the musculoskeletal system. Their use in children is not absolutely contraindicated, however. For certain severe infections where other antibiotics are not an option, their use can be justified. Quinolones should also not be given to people with a known hypersensitivity to the drug class.

The basic pharmacophore, or active structure, of the fluoroquinolone class is based upon the quinoline ring system. The addition of the fluorine atom at C6 distinguishes the successive-generation fluoroquinolones from the first-generation of quinolones. The addition of the C6 fluorine atom has since been demonstrated not to be required for the antibacterial activity of this class (circa 1997).

Antibiotic misuse and bacterial resistances 

Because the use of broad-spectrum antibiotics encourages the spread of multidrug-resistant strains and the development of Clostridium difficile infections, treatment guidelines often recommend minimizing the use of fluoroquinolones and other broad-spectrum antibiotics in less severe infections and in those in which risk factors for multidrug resistance are not present.  It has been recommended that fluoroquinolones not be used as a first-line agent for community-acquired pneumonia, instead recommending macrolide or doxycycline as first-line agents. The Drug-Resistant Streptococcus pneumoniae Working Group recommends fluoroquinolones be used for the ambulatory treatment of community-acquired pneumonia only after other antibiotic classes have been tried and failed, or in cases with demonstrated drug-resistant Streptococcus pneumoniae.

Resistance to quinolones can evolve rapidly, even during a course of treatment. Numerous pathogens, including Escherichia coli, commonly exhibit resistance. Widespread veterinary usage of quinolones, in particular in Europe, has been implicated.

Fluoroquinolones had become the class of antibiotics most commonly prescribed to adults in 2002. Nearly half (42%) of these prescriptions were for conditions not approved by the U.S. FDA, such as acute bronchitis, otitis media, and acute upper respiratory tract infection, according to a study supported in part by the Agency for Healthcare Research and Quality. In addition, they are commonly prescribed for medical conditions, such as acute respiratory illness, that are usually caused by viral infections.

Three mechanisms of resistance are known. Some types of efflux pumps can act to decrease intracellular quinolone concentration. In gram-negative bacteria, plasmid-mediated resistance genes produce proteins that can bind to DNA gyrase, protecting it from the action of quinolones. Finally, mutations at key sites in DNA gyrase or topoisomerase IV can decrease their binding affinity to quinolones, decreasing the drugs' effectiveness.

Mechanism of action

Quinolones are chemotherapeutic bactericidal drugs. They interfere with DNA replication by preventing bacterial DNA from unwinding and duplicating. Specifically, they inhibit the ligase activity of the type II topoisomerases, DNA gyrase and topoisomerase IV, which cut DNA to introduce supercoiling, while leaving nuclease activity unaffected. With the ligase activity disrupted, these enzymes release DNA with single- and double-strand breaks that lead to cell death. The majority of quinolones in clinical use are fluoroquinolones, which have a fluorine atom attached to the central ring system, typically at the 6-position or C-7 position. Most of them are named with the -oxacin suffix. First and second generation quinolones are largely active against Gram-negative bacteria, whereas third and fourth generation quinolones have increased activity against Gram-positive and anaerobic bacteria. Some quinolones containing aromatic substituents at their C-7 positions are highly active against eukaryotic type II topoisomerase.

It has also been proposed that quinolone antibiotics cause oxidation of guanine nucleotides in the bacterial nucleotide pool, and that this process contributes to the cytotoxicity of these agents.  The incorporation of oxidized guanine nucleotides into DNA could be bactericidal.  Bacterial cytotoxicity could arise from incomplete repair of closely spaced 8-oxo-2'-deoxyguanosine  in the DNA resulting in double-strand breaks.

Cellular uptake
Fluoroquinolones can enter cells easily via porins, so are often used to treat intracellular pathogens such as Legionella pneumophila and Mycoplasma pneumoniae. For many Gram-negative bacteria, DNA gyrase is the target, whereas topoisomerase IV is the target for many Gram-positive bacteria.

Eukaryotic cells are not believed to contain DNA gyrase or topoisomerase IV. However, debate exists concerning whether the quinolones still have such an adverse effect on the DNA of healthy cells. Some compounds in this class have been shown to inhibit the synthesis of mitochondrial DNA.

Pharmacology
The basic pharmacophore, or active structure, of the fluoroquinolone class is based upon the quinoline ring system. Various substitutions made to the quinoline ring resulted in the development of numerous fluoroquinolone drugs. The addition of the fluorine atom at C-6 distinguishes the successive-generation fluoroquinolones from the first-generation quinolones, although examples are known that omit the atom while retaining antibacterial activity.

Pharmacokinetics

History

Although not formally a quinolone, nalidixic acid is considered the first quinolone drug. It was introduced in 1962 for treatment of urinary tract infections (UTIs) in humans. Nalidixic acid was discovered by George Lesher and coworkers in a distillate during an attempt at chloroquine synthesis. Nalidixic acid is thus considered to be the predecessor of all members of the quinolone family, including the second, third and fourth generations commonly known as fluoroquinolones. Since the introduction of nalidixic acid, more than 10,000 analogs have been synthesized, but only a handful have found their way into clinical practice. The first generation also included other quinolone drugs, such as pipemidic acid, oxolinic acid, and cinoxacin, which were introduced in the 1970s. They proved to be only marginal improvements over nalidixic acid.

These drugs were widely used as a first-line treatment for many infections, including very commons ones such as acute sinusitis, acute bronchitis, and uncomplicated UTIs. Reports of serious adverse events began emerging, and the FDA first added a black-box warning to fluoroquinolones in July 2008 for the increased risk of tendinitis and tendon rupture. In February 2011, the risk of worsening symptoms for those with myasthenia gravis was added to the warning. In August 2013, the agency required updates to the labels to describe the potential for irreversible peripheral neuropathy (serious nerve damage).

In November 2015, an FDA Advisory Committee discussed the risks and benefits of fluoroquinolones for the treatment of acute bacterial sinusitis, acute bacterial exacerbation of chronic bronchitis, and uncomplicated UTIs based on new safety information. The new information focused on two or more side effects occurring at the same time and causing the potential for irreversible impairment. The advisory committee concluded that the serious risks associated with the use of fluoroquinolones for these types of uncomplicated infections generally outweighed the benefits for patients with other treatment options. The 21-member joint committee overwhelmingly recommended stronger label warnings on the containers because of rare but sometimes devastating side effects.

On 12 May 2016, the FDA issued a drug safety communication advising that fluoroquinolones should be reserved for these conditions only when no other options are available due to potentially permanent, disabling side effects occurring together. The drug safety communication also announced the required labeling updates to reflect this new safety information. The FDA put out another label change in July 2017, strengthening the warnings about potentially disabling adverse effects and limiting use of these drugs to second-line treatments for acute sinusitis, acute bronchitis, and uncomplicated UTIs.

Generations
The first generation of the quinolones began following introduction of the related, but structurally distinct naphthyridine-family nalidixic acid in 1962 for treatment of UTIs in humans. Nalidixic acid was discovered by George Lesher and coworkers in a chemical distillate during an attempt at synthesis of the chloroquinoline antimalarial agent, chloroquine. Naphthyridone and quinolone classes of antibiotics prevent bacterial DNA replication by inhibition of DNA unwinding events, and can be both bacteriostatic and bacteriocidal. (See Mechanism of Action later.) The majority of quinolones in clinical use belong to the second generation class of "fluoroquinolones", which have a true quinoline framework, maintain the C-3 carboxylic acid group, and add a fluorine atom to the all-carbon containing ring, typically at the C-6 or C-7 positions.

Quinolones can be classified into generations based on their antibacterial spectra. The earlier-generation agents are, in general, more narrow-spectrum than the later ones, but no standard is employed to determine which drug belongs to which generation. The only universal standard applied is the grouping of the non-fluorinated drugs found within this class (quinolones) within the first-generation heading. As such, a wide variation exists within the literature dependent upon the methods employed by the authors.

The first generation is rarely used. Frequently prescribed drugs are Avelox (moxifloxacin), Cipro (ciprofloxacin), Levaquin (levofloxacin), and, to some extent, their generic equivalents.

First generation
 flumequine (veterinary use)
 oxolinic acid
 rosoxacin
Structurally related first-generation drugs, but formally not 4-quinolones, include cinoxacin, nalidixic acid, and piromidic acid, pipemidic acid

Second generation
The second-generation class is sometimes subdivided into "Class 1" and "Class 2".

 ciprofloxacin
 fleroxacin
 lomefloxacin 
 nadifloxacin
 norfloxacin
 ofloxacin 
 pefloxacin
 rufloxacin
A structurally related second-generation drug, but formally not a 4-quinolone, is enoxacin.

Third generation
Unlike the first and second generations, the third generation is active against streptococci.

 balofloxacin
 grepafloxacin 
 levofloxacin
 pazufloxacin
 sparfloxacin
 temafloxacin
A structurally related third-generation drug, but formally not a 4-quinolone, is tosufloxacin (Ozex, Tosacin).

Fourth generation
Fourth-generation fluoroquinolones act at DNA gyrase and topoisomerase IV. This dual action slows development of resistance.

 clinafloxacin 
 gatifloxacin
 moxifloxacin 
 sitafloxacin
 prulifloxacin
 besifloxacin
 delafloxacin
Two structurally related third-generation drugs, but formally not 4-quinolones, are gemifloxacin and trovafloxacin (removed from clinical use).

In development:
 ozenoxacin

Veterinary use
Quinolones have been widely used in animal husbandry, and several agents have veterinary-specific applications.
 danofloxacin – 2nd gen, related to ciprofloxacin
 difloxacin – 2nd/3rd gen, related to temafloxacin
 enrofloxacin – 2nd gen, metabolizes into ciprofloxacin
 ibafloxacin – 3rd gen, related to levofloxacin
 marbofloxacin – 3rd gen, related to levofloxacin
 orbifloxacin – 3rd gen, related to sparfloxacin
 sarafloxacin – 2nd/3rd gen, related to difloxacin

References

External links
 
 Healthcare-associated Infections (HAIs)- Quinolones and the Clinical Laboratory CDC
 Information for Healthcare Professionals: Fluoroquinolone Antimicrobial Drugs from the U.S. Food and Drug Administration
 Fluoroquinolones  "Family Practice Notebook" entry page for Fluoroquinolones
 Structure Activity Relationships "Antibacterial Agents; Structure Activity Relationships," André Bryskier MD

Wikipedia articles incorporating text from the United States Department of Health and Human Services